"Just a Little Bit Better" is a song written by Kenny Young and released as a single under his name (ATCO Records 45–6322) in October 1964.

History
A 1965 cover by Herman's Hermits reached No. 7 on the US Billboard Hot 100, No. 10 on the UK's New Musical Express chart, No. 15 on the UK's Record Retailer chart, and No. 9 on Canada's RPM Play Sheet.  It also reached No. 1 in Malaysia, No. 7 in Sweden, No. 11 in New Zealand, and No. 40 in Australia.  It was featured on their 1965 album, The Best of Herman's Hermits.  It is also featured on their 1966 EP, A Must to Avoid. The Herman's Hermits recording was produced by Mickie Most.

Billboard described the song as a "smooth rocker with another clever set of lyrics and a Buddy Holly vocal
sound," calling the song a "chartbuster."  Cash Box described it as a "rhythmic, easy-going twangy ditty about a lad who makes a dramatic plea of devotion to the very special girl of his dreams."

References

External links
 Just a Little Bit Better on Discogs
 Just a Little Bit Better on Lyrics.com

1965 songs
1965 singles
Songs written by Kenny Young
Herman's Hermits songs
Song recordings produced by Mickie Most
MGM Records singles
Number-one singles in Malaysia